Mont Ida is an unincorporated community in Anderson County, Kansas, United States.  As of the 2020 census, the population of the community and nearby areas was 23.

History
Mont Ida had its start in the year 1880 by the building of the railroad through that territory.

A post office was opened in Mont Ida in 1880, and remained in operation until it was discontinued in 1944.

Demographics

For statistical purposes, the United States Census Bureau has defined Mont Ida as a census-designated place (CDP).

References

Further reading

External links
 Anderson County maps: Current, Historic, KDOT

Unincorporated communities in Anderson County, Kansas
Unincorporated communities in Kansas